William Jones (1871–1909) was a Native American anthropologist of the Fox nation. Alternate name: Megasiáwa (Black Eagle). 
Born in Oklahoma on March 28, 1871, after studying at Hampton Institute he graduated from  Phillips Academy and went on to receive his B.A. from Harvard. When in 1904 he received his PhD from Columbia University as a student of Franz Boas, he became the fourth person to receive a PhD in linguistic anthropology, twelfth person to receive a PhD in anthropology, and first Native American PhD in anthropology.

Jones was biologically only part Fox but was raised by his Fox maternal grandmother between the ages of one, when his mother died, and nine, when his grandmother died.  He is known as a specialist in Algonquian languages, particularly known for his extensive collection of Algonquian texts.  In 1908 while employed as an assistant curator at the Field Museum he went to the Philippines to do fieldwork. He was killed on March 29, 1909, at Dumobato on the east side of Luzon in an altercation with some of the Ilongot among whom he was engaged in fieldwork.

Biography  
William Jones was born to Henry Clay Jones and Sarah (Penny) Jones. He was born with an ethnicity of Fox, Welsh, and English. His mother, Sarah, died when he was an infant, which led him to be cared for by his grandmother, Kitiqua. Jones great-grandfather, Kitiqua's father, named Wa-shi-ho-wa, taught Jones the tradition, language, and customs of their Fox ancestors. At the age of ten, Jones was sent to the Indian school at Newton, where he eventually became a cowboy after some years. At 18 years of age, he went to Hampton Institute where he was considered a prize pupil.

After that, he enrolled into Phillips Academy at Andover, Massachusetts. In 1896, He went to Harvard, where he wrote for and was editor for Harvard Monthly, and received his A.B degree. He then continued his studies at Columbia University where he led and held a fellowship and later became an assistant in anthropology. During this time, Jones carried on exploratory work among the Saux and Fox. Once he received his PHD from Columbia in 1904, he commenced investigations along the northern Algonquian tribes. Jones wrote short stories about Native Americans and the American West, magazine articles, and gave lectures.

Publications by William Jones 
Jones, William, "Frederic Remington's Pictures of Frontier Life”, The Harvard Monthly, Vol. 27 No. 5, February 1899, 186–190.
Jones, William, “An Episode of the Spring Round-Up”, The Harvard Monthly, Vol. 28 No. 2, April 1899, 46–53.
Jones, William, “Anoska Nimiwina”, The Harvard Monthly, Vol. 28 No. 3, May 1899, 102–111.
Jones, William, “Lydie”, The Harvard Monthly, Vol. 28 No. 5, July 1899, 194–201.
Jones, William, “Chiky”, The Harvard Monthly, Vol. 29 No. 2, November 1899, 59–65.
Jones, William, “In the Name of His Ancestor”, The Harvard Monthly, Vol. 29 No. 3, December 1899, 109–115.
Jones, William, “The Heart of the Brave”, The Harvard Monthly, Vol. 30 No. 3, May 1900, 99-106.
Jones, William, “A Lone Star Ranger”, The Harvard Monthly, Vol. 30 No. 4, June 1900, 154–161.
Jones, William, “Episodes in the Culture-Hero Myth of the Sauks and Foxes [The Culture-Hero Tradition of the Sauk and Fox]”, Journal of American Folk-Lore, Vol. XIV, October–December, 1901, 225–239.
Jones, William, “Some Principles of Algonquian Word-Formation”, American Anthropologist, New Series, Vol. VI, no. 3, Supplement, 1904. This is Jones' doctoral thesis at Columbia.
Jones, William, “The Algonkin Manitou [The Concept of the Manitou]”, Journal of American Folk-Lore, Vol. XVIII, July–September, 1905, 183–190.
Jones, William, “Central Algonquin”, Annual Archaeological Report, Toronto, Canada, 1905.
Jones, William, “Ojibwa ethnographic and linguistic field notes”, Archival material at unspecified location, either American Museum of Natural History, Carnegie Institute, Smithsonian, or Field Museum, 1903–1905.
Jones, William, “An Algonquin Syllabary”, Boas Anniversary Volume (New York, G.E. Stechert),1906, 88–93.
Jones, William, “Mortuary Observances and the Adoption Rites of the Algonkin Foxes of Iowa”, Congrès International des Américanistes, Quebec, 1906, 1907.
Jones, William, “Fox Texts”, Publications of the American Ethnological Society, Leyden, E.J. Brill, Vol. I, 1907, 383 pages.
Jones, William, “Notes on the Fox Indians”, Journal of American Folk-Lore, vol. 24, April–June 1911.
Jones, William, “Algonquian (Fox), an Illustrative Sketch”, Handbook of American Indian Languages, Bureau of American Ethnology (Boas), Bulletin 40, Pt. 1, 1911, 735–874.
Jones, William, and Truman Michelson. Kickapoo tales. Leyden: E.J. Brill, 1915.
Jones, William, and Truman Michelson. “Ojibwa texts collected by William Jones”. Publications of the American Ethnological Society, Vol. VII—Part I. Leyden: E.J. Brill, 1917.
Jones, William, and Truman Michelson. “Ojibwa texts collected by William Jones”. Publications of the American Ethnological Society, Vol. VII—Part II. Leyden: New York: G.E. Stechert & Co., Agents, 1919.
Fisher, Margaret Welpley, “William Jones’ ‘Ethnography of the Fox Indians’”, doctoral dissertation, Smithsonian Institution Bureau of American Ethnology, Bulletin 125, Philadelphia, 1939.  This is based on Jones’ secret, sealed manuscript, edited by Fisher. “The Iowa Foxes initiated him into many ancient mysteries of their religion, which have never been disclosed to a white man. Jones committed to paper an account of these, with sketches, diagrams and the full interpretation which probably no other man could have supplied. The document he then sealed. It will not be opened until the older Indians have gone to their fathers, taking their lore with them.” Rideout, p. 47
Jones, William, “The Diary of William Jones: 1907-1909, Robert F. Cummings Philippine Expedition”, Dumabato, Isabela Province, Luzon, Philippines, The Field Museum of Chicago.
Overholt, T. W., Callicott,  J. B., & Jones, W. "Clothed-in-fur, and other tales: an introduction to an Ojibwa world view." Washington, D.C., University Press of America, 1982.

Bibliography 
Wissler, Clark, “Obituary of Dr. Jones”, The American Museum Journal, Volume IX, Number 5, May 1909, 123.
William Jones, The Journal of American Folk-Lore, Vol. XXII, 1909, 262.
Jones, William 1900，Harvard Bulletin, April 14, 1909, 4.
Jones, William 1900, Harvard Bulletin, 16 Oct., 1912.
Rideout, Henry Milner, “William Jones, Indian, Cowboy, American Scholar, and Anthropologist in the Field", Frederick A. Stokes Company, New York, 1912.
George Ballard Bowers, “An Indian Martyr To Science”, The Southern Workman, Hampton Normal and Agricultural Institution, Vol. LIV, April 1925, No. 4, 144-153.
Peabody Museum, “Correspondence, photos and clippings about William Jones”, Peabody Museum archival collection, Harvard University, PM x-file 47-66 and 47-66A.
Hall, Robert L., "William Jones: American Indian Anthropologist and Martyr", Proc. of the 92nd annual meeting of the American Anthropological Association, 17-21 Nov., Washington, DC, 1993.
Hampton Normal and Agricultural Institution, “William Jones (Megasiawa, Black Eagle)”, Hampton Normal and Agricultural Institution Catalog, copy in Peabody Museum x-file 47-66.
Van Stone, James W., Mesquakie (Fox) material culture: the William Jones and Frederick Starr collections, Field Museum of Natural History, Chicago, 1998.

References
 Bloomfield, Leonard (1922) "The Owl Sacred Pack of the Fox Indians" The American Journal of Philology 43(3): 276-281
 Bernstein, Jay H. (2002) "First Recipients of Anthropological Doctorates in the United States, 1891-1930" American Anthropologist 104 (2): 551-564

External links
 Headhunting William Jones
 Field Museum
 photos of Jones' killers
 Biographical sketch
 William Jones

1871 births
1909 deaths
20th-century Native Americans
American anthropologists
Anthropological linguists
Columbia Graduate School of Arts and Sciences alumni
Harvard University alumni
Headhunting accounts and studies
Linguists from the United States
Native American anthropologists
Native American linguists
Native American writers
Phillips Academy alumni
People murdered in the Philippines
American people murdered abroad